Good Love Is Hard to Find has been used as the title of the following songs:
 A song by the Dave Clark Five released on their self-titled compilation album
 A song by Ronnie Spector from the album Unfinished Business
 A song by Sara Evans from the album Slow Me Down